The Eighth Street Historic District is located in Manitowoc, Wisconsin.

History
The district is Manitowoc's old downtown, with many first stories remodeled, but many historic upper stories intact. Interesting structures include the 1853 Schultz house, the 1857 Italianate-styled Berner's Hardware Store, the 1865/1878 Fricke/Schreihart Brewery, the 1875/1880 Queen Anne Wernecke Bakery, the 3-story 1890 Queen Anne I.O.O.F. Hall, the 1895 High Victorian Italianate Jarchow Blacksmith shop, the 1901 Neoclassical German-American Bank, the 1901 Beaux Arts Schuette Brothers Department Store, the 1906 Christ H. Tegen-designed Beaux-Arts-styled Manitowoc County Courthouse and the 1927 Mediterranean-flavored Hotel Manitowoc.

References

Historic districts on the National Register of Historic Places in Wisconsin
National Register of Historic Places in Manitowoc County, Wisconsin